Ancient Greek technology developed during the 5th century BC, continuing up to and including the Roman period, and beyond. Inventions that are credited to the ancient Greeks include the gear, screw, rotary mills, bronze casting techniques, water clock, water organ, the torsion catapult, the use of steam to operate some experimental machines and toys, and a chart to find prime numbers. Many of these inventions occurred late in the Greek period, often inspired by the need to improve weapons and tactics in war. However, peaceful uses are shown by their early development of the watermill, a device which pointed to further exploitation on a large scale under the Romans. They developed surveying and mathematics to an advanced state, and many of their technical advances were published by philosophers, like Archimedes and Heron.

Water technology
Some fields that were encompassed in the area of water resources (mainly for urban use) included groundwater exploitation, construction of aqueducts for water supply, storm water and wastewater sewerage systems, flood protection. and drainage, construction and use of fountains, baths and other sanitary and purgatory facilities, and even recreational uses of water. Excellent examples of these technologies include the drainage system found in the Anatolian west coast, which featured an unusual masonry outlet structure that allowed self-cleaning of the drainage outlet. The technology, which demonstrated the Greek understanding of the importance of hygienic conditions to public health, was part of an elaborate drainage system and underground water supply network.

Mining
The Greeks developed extensive silver mines at Laurium, the profits from which helped support the growth of Athens as a city-state. It involved mining the ores in underground galleries, washing them, and smelting it to produce the metal. Elaborate washing tables still exist at the site, which used rainwater held in cisterns and collected during the winter months. Mining also helped to create currency by the conversion of the metal into coinage. Greek mines had tunnels that were as deep as 330 feet and were worked by slaves using picks and iron hammers. The extracted ore were lifted by small skips hauled by a rope that was sometimes guided by a wheel placed against the rim of the mine shaft.

Inventions

See also
 Museum of Ancient Greek Technology
 Roman technology
 Medieval technology
 List of Byzantine inventions

References

Sources

Further reading
 Kotsanas, Kostas (2009) - "Familiar and Unfamiliar Aspects of Ancient Greek Technology"
 Kotsanas, Kostas (2008) - "Ancient Greek Technology"

External links
What the Ancient Greeks did for us, BBC documentary

 
Greek
Greek inventions